Smodicum angusticolle is a species of beetle in the family Cerambycidae. It was described by Per Olof Christopher Aurivillius in 1919.

References

Cerambycinae
Beetles described in 1919